The 2015–16 Armenian Cup is the 25th season of Armenia's football knockout competition. It featured the eight 2015–16 Premier League teams, but no team from the 2015–16 First Division. The tournament began on 21 October 2015, with Pyunik the defending champions, having won their seventh title the previous season.

Results

Quarter-finals
All eight Premier League clubs competed in this round. The first legs were played on 21 and 28 October 2015, while the second legs were played on 4 and 25 November 2015.

|}

Semi-finals
The first legs were played on 15 and 16 March 2016 and the second legs were played on 12 and 13 April 2016.

Final
Final was played on 4 May 2016.

References

Armenian Cup seasons
Armenian Cup
Cup